Battles of Asiago Plateau may refer either of the following engagements:
Battle of Mount Ortigara from 10 to 25 June 1917
Battle of Asiago 15 May 1916